Ukee may refer to:

Ukee, a local short name for the town of Ucluelet, Vancouver Island, British Columbia, Canada
Ukee Radio, CIMM-FM, a local radio station
Ukee Washington (born 1958), American TV news anchor